Filibacter is a Gram-negative strictly aerobic bacteria genus from the family of Planococcaceae. Up to now there iso only one species of this genus known (Filibacter limicola).

References

Further reading 
 
 

Bacillales
Monotypic bacteria genera
Bacteria genera